Diastrophella is a genus of beetles in the family Cicindelidae, containing the following species:

 Diastrophella pauliani Rivalier, 1957
 Diastrophella richardi Rivalier, 1957

References

Cicindelidae